Yongsan Station is a station of Daegu Metro Line 2 in Yongsan-dong, Dalseo District, Daegu.

External links 
  Cyber station information from Daegu Metropolitan Transit Corporation

Daegu Metro stations
Dalseo District
Railway stations opened in 2005